Dublin City Council published a plan in 2011 to supply up to 350 million litres of water a day from Lough Derg to Dublin city and region. In January 2014, Irish Water took over management of the project which is currently in the Planning Stage. In 2016 it was proposed that over two million people will benefit from the water supplying not only Dublin but also an area including Arklow, Athlone, Athy, Carlow, Drogheda, Mullingar, Navan, Portaloise and Tullamore. In 2018 Irish Water announced plans to seek planning permission for the project.

Project now under review
The proposed pipeline has now been sent for review by the CRU, Irish Water’s economic regulator, amid questions about Irish Water’s leakage targets, whether groundwater was appropriately considered as an alternative to the pipeline, and the cost of the proposal.

Environmental and economic concerns
Various groups are opposing the pipeline on, among other things, economic and environmental grounds.  The River Shannon Protection Alliance, Fight the Pipe and Kennedy Analysis have been the most vocal opponents.
One of the key arguments of those objecting to the pipeline is that if Irish Water met its own leakage reduction targets in Dublin there would be no need for the pipeline at all.

Kennedy Analysis appeared before the Joint Committee on Housing, Planning and Local Government (alongside Irish Water) in April 2018 to debate the proposed pipeline.

Ireland has extremely high levels of leakage -  according to Irish Water’s 2015 business plan network leakage alone (i.e. leakage on the distribution side of the network, not including any household leakage) was 49%.

Average leakage in cities around the globe is considerably lower than this – a 2017 KPMG study of 35 studies globally found that average leakage was 10-13%.

Preferred route
In November 2016 the Parteen Basin to the south of the lough was chosen as the proposed site of extraction. Water would be pumped via Birdhill to a break pressure tank at Knockanacree near Cloughjordan, all in County Tipperary and gravity fed from there to Peamount in Dublin.

Concerns
Various groups have been formed by those challenging the pipe.

As the proposed extraction of water upstream of the ESB's hydroelectric station at Ardnacrusha may reduce the flow available for the generation of electricity, Irish Water will compensate ESB for any loss.

References

Water supply infrastructure
Freshwater pipelines
Water in Ireland
Water supply and sanitation in the Republic of Ireland
River Shannon